Eois tegularia is a moth in the  family Geometridae. It is found in Brazil and in Cuba. It has also been recorded from North America.

References

Moths described in 1858
Eois
Moths of North America
Moths of South America